Kahoku is the name of several places in Japan:

Kahoku, Ishikawa, a small city in Ishikawa Prefecture
Kahoku District, Ishikawa, a district in Ishikawa Prefecture
Kahoku, Kōchi, a defunct town in Kochi Prefecture
Kahoku, Kumamoto, a defunct town in Kumamoto Prefecture
Kahoku, Yamagata, a town in Yamagata Prefecture